Plainville Airpark  was a city-owned, public-use airport located three nautical miles (6 km) south of the central business district of Plainville, a city in Rooks County, Kansas, United States.

Facilities and aircraft 
Plainville Airpark covered an area of 15 acres (6 ha) at an elevation of 2,182 feet (665 m) above mean sea level. It had one runway designated 17/35 with a turf surface measuring 2,600 by 120 feet (792 x 37 m). For the 12-month period ending May 27, 2010, the airport had 3,200 aircraft operations, an average of 61 per week: 94% general aviation and 6% air taxi.

See also 

References

External links 
 Airport diagram and aerial photo from Kansas DOT
 Aeronautical chart from SkyVector
 Aerial image as of August 1991 from USGS The National Map

Defunct airports in Kansas
Airports in Kansas
Buildings and structures in Rooks County, Kansas
Transportation in Rooks County, Kansas